A great number of words of French origin have entered the English language to the extent that many Latin words have come to the English language.

D

dace
dagger
daguerreotype
dainty,  Old Fr. 
dais, Old Fr. 
dally
dalmatic, Old Fr. 
damage, Old Fr. 
dame
damn, Fr. 
damnable
damnation
damsel
dance
dandelion
danger
dangerous
darnel
dart
date
daub
daunt
dauphin
dean, Old Fr. , compare Mod. Fr. 
debacle
debar
debark
debase
debatable
debate
debauch
debauchee
debilitation
debility
debit
debonair
debridement
debris
debt, Old Fr. , compare Mod. Fr. 
debtor, Old Fr. , relatinized in Modern Fr.  (from )
debut
debutant
debutante
decade
decadence
decadent
Decalogue
decamp
decant
decapitate
decapitation
decapod
decay
decease
deceit
deceive
December
decent
decentralisation
deception
deceptive
decide
decider
decilitre
decimetre
decision
decisive
declaim
declamation
declarant
declaration
declarative
declare
déclassé
declination
decline
declivity
decoction
décolletage
décolleté
decompose
décor or decor
decorative
decoupage
decouple
decrease
decree
decrepit
decrepitude
decry
decuple
dedication
deduction
deface
defamation, Old Fr. diffamacion, compare Mod. Fr. diffamation
defamatory
defame
default, Old Fr. defaute, compare Mod. Fr. défaut
defeasance
defeat, Old Fr. desfait, pp. of desfaire, compare Mod. Fr. défaite
defeatist
defect
defective
defence or defense
defend
defendant
defendor
defensible
defensive
defer
deference
deferent
defiance
deficit
defile
define
definition
definitive
defloration
deflower
deforest
deforestation
deform
deformation
deformity
defraud
defray
defrock
defunct
defy
degeneration
deglutition
degradation
degrade
degree
deific
deign
deism
deist
deity
déjà vu
deject
dejection
delay, Old Fr. , compare Mod. Fr. 
delectable
delectation
delegate
deliberation
deliberative
delicious
delight
delimit
delimitation
delinquent
deliver
deliverance
delivery
deluge
de luxe or deluxe
demand
demarche
demeanor
dement
demerit
demesne
demimonde
demise
demission
demitasse
democracy
democrat
democratic
democratize
démodé
demoiselle
demolish
demolition
demonetization
demonstration
demonstrative
demoralize
demur
demure
demurrage
demurrer
denationalize
denature
denier
denim
denizen
Dennis
denomination
denote
denouement
denounce
dense
density
dental
dentifrice
dentist
denture
denudation
denude
deny
deodand
dépanneur
depart
department
departmental
departure
depeche
depend
dependant
dependence
depiction
depilatory
deplorable
deplore
deploy, Fr. 
deployment
deport
deportation
deportment
depose
deposition
depot
deprave
deprecation
deprecative
depredation
depress
depression
deprive
deputation
depute
deputy
deracinate
derail
derailleur
derailment
derange
derangement
deride
de rigueur
derision
derivation
derivative
derive
derogation
derrière
descant
descend, Old Fr. 
descendant
descension
descent
describe
description
descry
desecrate
desert, Old Fr. 
desertion
deserve
deshabille
desiccation
designation
desirable
desire
desirous
desist
Des Moines
desolation
despair
desperation
despise
despite
despoil
despot
despotic
despotism
dessert
destine
destiny
destitution
destrier
destroy
destroyer
destruction
destructive
desuetude
detach
detachment (Fr. )
detail (Fr. )
detain (Old Fr. )
détente
detention
deterge
detergent
deterioration
determination
determinative
determine
detest
detestable
detestation
detonation
detour
detract
detraction
detractor
detriment
Detroit (Fr.  = strait)
devastation
develop
development
deviation
device (Old Fr. )
devise
devoid
devoir
devotion
devour (Old Fr. )
devout (Old Fr. )
dexterity
diabolic
diabolical
diadem
diagonal
diagram
dialect
dialectic
dialogue
diamanté
diameter
diamond
diaper
diarrhea
diatonic
diatribe
didactic
diet
differ
difference
different
difficulty
dig
digestible
digestion
digestif
digestive
dignity (Old Fr. )
dilatation
dilate
diligence
diligent
dime, Old Fr.  "a tenth part", compare Mod. Fr. 
diminish
diminution
diminutive
dine
dinner
diocesan
diocese
diorama
diphtheria
diphthong
diplomacy, Fr. 
diplomat
direction (Fr. )
director
dirigible, Fr. 
disaccustom
disadvantage
disagree
disagreeable
disallow
disappoint (Fr. )
disarm (Old Fr. )
disaster
disastrous
disavow
disband
disburse
discern
discernable
discernment
discharge
discipline
disclaim
disclaimer
disclose
discolour
discomfit
discomfiture
discomfort
disconcert
discontinuance
discontinue
discord
discordant
discothèque or discothèque, thus disco
discount
discountenance
discourage
discourse
discover (Old Fr. )
discreet
discretion
discursive
discussion
disdain
disease
disenchant
disenfranchise
disengage
disfavour
disfigure
disgorge
disgrace
disguise(Old Fr. )
disgust
dishabille
dishevel
dishonest
dishonesty
dishonour
disillusion
disinclination
disinfect
disinfectant
disinter
disjoint
disjunction
dislocation
dislodge
disloyal
disloyalty
dismal
dismantle
dismay
dismember
disobedience
disobedient
disobey
disoblige
disorder
disorganize
disorient
disparage
disparagement
disparity
dispensation
dispense
dispenser
disperse
dispersion
displace
display
displease
displeasure
disport, Old Fr. 
disposable
dispose
disposition
dispossess
disprove
disputation
dispute
dissension
dissever
dissimulation
dissociation
dissolution
dissonance
dissonant
dissuade
distance
distant
distemper
distention
distill
distillery
distinct
distinction
distinctive
distingue
distinguish
distress
distribution
distributive
district
disturb
disturbance
disunion
disuse
ditty
diuretic
diverse
diversify
diversion
diversity
divert
divest
dividend
divination
divine
divinity
divisible
division
divorce
divorcee
docile
docility
doctor
doctrinaire
doctrine
document
dogmatism
doleful
dolmen, Fr.  also , perhaps incorrect transcription of Cornish 
dolomite
dolorous
dolphin
domain
dome
domestic
domicile
dominant
domination
dominion
domino
donation
donor
dormant
dormer
dorsal
dosage
dose
dossier
double
double entendre
doublet
doubloon
doubt
douche
dowager
dower
dowry
doyen
doyenne
dozen, from Old Fr. , compare modern Fr. 
drab
dragoman
dragon
dragoon
dram
dramaturge
dramaturgy
drape
draper
drapery
dress (Old Fr. )
dressage
dresser
droll
drollery
dromedary
dropsy, Old Fr. 
drug
druggist
druid, Old Fr. , from Latin , from Gaulish
dualism
duality
dub
dubitation
ducal
ducat
duchess
duchy
ductile
due (Old Fr. , pp. of )
duet
du jour
duke
dulcet
dulcimer
Duluth
dune
dungeon
dupe
duplication
duplicity
durability
durable
durance
duration
duress
during (Old Fr. , compare )
duty (Anglo-Fr.  from Old Fr. )
duvet
dynamic
dynasty
dysentery
dysphemism

E

eager, Old Fr. aigre
eagle, Old Fr.egle, compare modern Fr. aigle
ease, Old Fr. aise
easement
easy, Old Fr. aisie, compare modern Fr. aisé
eau de toilette
ebriety
ecarte
eccentric
ecclesiastic
echelon, Fr. échelon
éclair or éclair
éclat
eclectic
eclipse
economic
economist
écorché
ecru
ecstasy, Old Fr.estaise, compare modern Fr. extase
écu
edict
edification
edifice
edify
edition
education
efface
effect
effectual
effervescence
efficacy
efficient
effigy
effleurage
efflorescence
effort
effrontery
effuse
effusion
egalitarian
eglantine
egoism
egoist
egret
Egypt
ejaculation
ejection
elan
elapse
elastic
elation
election
elegance
elegant
elegiac
elegy
element
elementary
elephant, Old Fr. oliphant, compare modern Fr. éléphant
elevation
eligible
elite or élite
ellipse
eloign
elope
elopement
eloquence
eloquent
elucidate
email
emancipation
embalm
embark
embarkation

embarrass
embarrassment
embassy
embattle
embellish
embezzle
emblem
emblematic
embolism
embonpoint
emboss
embouchure
embrace
embrasure
embroider
embroidery
embroil
emerald
emerge
emergence
emery
emetic
emigre or émigré
eminence
eminent
emir, Fr. émir, colloquial pronunciation of Ar. amir "commander"
emissary
emission
emollient
emolument
emotion
empanel
emperor (Old Fr. empereor)
empire
emplacement
employ (Middle Fr. employer)
empress
emprise
emulation
emulsion
enamel
enamour
en bloc
enceinte
enchant
enchanter
enchantment
enclave
enclose
encore
encounter
encourage, from Old Fr. encoragier, compare modern Fr. encourager
encouragement
encroach
encrust
encumber
encumbrance
endeavour or endeavor
endive
endorphin
endorse
endothermic
endow
endue
endurance
endure (Old Fr. endurer)
enemy, Old Fr. enemi, compare modern Fr. ennemi
energy (Fr. énergie)
enervation
enfant terrible
enfeeble
enfilade
enforce
enforcement
enfranchise
engage
engagement
engender
engine
engineer
engorge
engrain
engross
enhance
enjambment
enjoin
enjoy (Old Fr. enjoir)
enlace
enlarge
en masse
enmity, from Old Fr. enemistié, compare modern Fr. inimitié
ennoble
ennui
enormity
en passant
enrage
enrich, Old Fr. enrichir
enroll
enrollment
en route
ensample
ensemble
ensign
ensue
en suite or ensuite
ensure
entente
enter, Old Fr. entrer
enterprise
entertain
enthrone, M.E. enthronize, from Old Fr. introniser
enthusiasm
entice
enticement
entire
entitle
entomb, Old Fr. entomber
entomology
entourage
entrails
entrain
entrant
entrap
entreat
entrée
entrepot
entrepreneur
entry
enumeration
envelop
envelope, Fr. enveloppe
envenom
enviable
envious
environ, Old Fr. environer
environs
envisage, Fr. envisager
envoy, Fr. envoyé
envy, Old Fr. envie
epaulet or epaulette, Fr. épaulette
épée or épée
epic, Fr. épique
epicurean, Old Fr. Epicurien
epidemic, Fr. épidémique
epidemy, Old Fr. ypidime, compare Mod. Fr. épidémie
epigram
epilepsy
epileptic
epilogue
epiphany
episcopal
episode
epistle
epitaph
epithet
epitome
epizootic
equality, from Old French equalité, compare modern Fr. égalité
equanimity
equation
equerry
equidistant
equilibrate
equinox
equip
equipage, Fr.équipage
equipment, Fr. équipement
equitable
equity, Old Fr. équité
equivalence
erectile
ergot
ermine, Old Fr. ermine, compare Modern Fr. hermine
erode, Fr. éroder
erosion, Fr. érosion
erotic, Fr. érotique
errant
erratic
erroneous
eruption
escadrille
escalade
escallop
escapade
escape
escargots
escarole
escarp
escarpment
escheat
eschew
esclavage
escort
escritoire
escrow
escutcheon
espadrille
espalier
especial
espionage
esplanade
espousal
espouse
esprit
espy
esquire
essay
essence
establish, Old Fr. establiss-, prp. stem of establir
estaminet
estate (Old Fr. estat)
esteem
estimable
estimation
estop
estoppel
estrange
etagere
eternal
eternity
ether
ethic
etiquette
etude
etui
etymology
eucalyptus
Eucharist (Old Fr. eucariste)
Eugene
eunuch
euphony
European, Fr. Européen
europium
Eustace
evacuation
evacuee
evade
evagation
evaluate
evaluation
evanescent
evangel
evangelical
evangelist, Old Fr. évangéliste
evangelize
evaporation, Old Fr. évaporation
evasion, Fr. évasion
evasive
event
eventual
eviction
evidence
evident
evince
ewer
exaction
exactitude
exalt
exaltation
examination
examine
example
Excalibur, Old.Fr. Escalibor
exceed
excellence
excellent
except
exception
excess
excessive
exchange
exchequer
excise
excision
excitation
excite
exclaim
exclamation
excretion
excusable
excuse
execrable
execute
execution
executive
executor
exemplar
exemplary
exemplification
exempt
exemption
exercise
exhale
exhibition (Old Fr. exhibicion)
exhort
exhortation
exhumation
exhume
exigence
exile
exist
existence
existentialist
exorcise
exothermic
exotic
expand
expatriate
expatriation
expectant
expectation
expedience
expedient
expedition
expense
experience
experiment
expert
expertise
expiation
expiration
expire, Middle Fr. expirer
explication
explicit
exploit, Old Fr. esploit, compare Mod. Fr. exploiter
exploitation
exploration
explore
explosion
expose, Middle Fr. exposer
exposé or expose
exposition
expound
express
expression
expressive
expugn
expulsion
extend
extension
extent
extermination
extern
external
extraction, Old Fr. estraction, compare Mod. Fr. extraction
extradition
extraordinaire
extravagance
extreme
extremity
extrinsic
exuberance
exuberant
exult
exultation

F

fable
fabric, Middle Fr. fabrique
fabrication
fabulist
fabulous
facade
face
facet
facetious
facial
facile
facilitate
facility
faction
factor
factory
faculty
fade
faggot
faience, Fr. faïence
fail, Old Fr. failir, compare Mod. Fr. faillir
failure
faineant
faint
fair (n.), Anglo-Fr. feyre, from Old Fr. feire, compare Mod. Fr. foire
fairy, Old Fr. faerie, compare Mod. Fr. féerie
fait accompli
faith
falchion
falcon
falconer
falconry
false
falsify
falsity
fame
familial
familiar
familiarity
famine
famish
famous
fanfare
fantastic
fantasy, Old Fr. fantaisie
farce
fardel
farm
farmer
farrier
farthingale
fascinate
fashion, Old Fr. façon
fatal
fatality
fatigue
fatuity
faubourg
faucet
fault (Old Fr. faute)
Fauvist
faux
faux ami
faux pas
favour or favor
favourable or favorable
favourite or favorite
fawn (n.), Old Fr. faon
fay
feal
fealty
feasance
feasible
feast (Old Fr. feste)
feat
feature
febrifuge
feculent
fecund
federal
federalism
federation
fee
feeble
feign
feint, Old Fr. feint
felicity, Old French felicite, compare modern Fr. félicité
felon, Old French felon, compare modern Fr. félon
felony, Old French felonie, compare modern Fr. félonie
female (Old Fr. femelle)
feme covert
feme sole
feminine, Old Fr. femenin, compare Mod. Fr. féminin
feminism
feminist
femme fatale
fennel
fer de lance
feral
ferial
ferment
ferocity
ferret
ferrule
fertile
fertilisation
fertilise
fertility
fervent
fervour
festal
fester
festival
festive
festivity
festoon
fete
feu de joie
feud
feudal
feuilleton
fiancé
fiancée
fibre
fiche
fichu
fiction
fictive
fidelity
fief
fierce
fig
figuration
figurative
figure
figurine
filbert
file
filet
filial
filiation
filigree
fillet, compare filet
film noir
filter
filtration
final
finality
finance
financier
fin de siecle
fine (Old Fr. fin)
finesse
finish
finitude
firm (adj.), Old Fr. ferm, compare Mod. Fr. ferme
fiscal
fissure
fix
flagellation
flageolet
flagitious
flagon
flagrant
flair
flambé
flambeau
flamboyant
flame
flan
flaneur
flange
flank
flatter
flattery
flatulence
flatulent
flavour or *flavor
flèche
flechette
fleur-de-lis
fleuret
flexibility
flexible
floral
floret, Old Fr. florette, compare modern Fr. fleurette
florid
florin
florist
floss
flotsam
flounder
flour
flourish, Old Fr. floriss-
flower, Old Fr. flor, compare Mod. Fr. fleur
fluidity
flume
flush
flute
flutist
flux
foible
foie gras
foil
foliage (Fr. feuillage)
foliation
follies
folly (Old Fr. folie)
foment
fondant
fondue
font, Fr. fonte
fontanelle
fool, Old Fr. fol
forage
foray
force
force majeure
forcible
forecastle
foreclose
foreign (Old Fr. forain)
forest (Old Fr. forest)
forester
forestry
forfeit
forge
form
formality
formation
formative
formidable
formulary
fornication
fort
forte
fortification
fortify
fortitude
fortress
fortune
fosse
fossil
found (Old Fr. founder)
founder
foundry
fountain, Old Fr. fontaine
Fourierism
foyer
fracas
fractal
fraction, from Old French, compare modern Fr. fraction
fracture
fragile
fragility
fragrance
frail
frailly
framboise
franc
France
franchise
Francophone, a speaker of French (Fr. francophone)
frangible
frangipane
Franglais
frank, Old Fr. franc
frankincense
frap
frappé
fraternisation or fraternization
fraternise or fraternize
fraternity
fraud
fraudulent
fray
frenetic
frenzy
fret
friar
fricassee
frieze, Middle Fr. frise
frigate, Middle Fr. frégate
frigidity
fringe, Old Fr. frenge *frippery
frisk
frisson
fritter, Old Fr. friture
frivol
frivolity
frivolous
frizz
frock
fromage
front
frontier
frontispiece
frottage
frou-frou
frown, Old Fr. froignier, compare Mod. Fr. renfrogner
fructify
frugal
frugality
fruit
fry
fuel
fugitive
fugue
full (v.)
fulminant
fulmination
fume
fumigation
fuck, Old Fr. foutre, Latin futuere, Greek, ficken
function, Old Fr. function, compare Mod. Fr. fonction
functionary
fund
funeral
funereal
funest
funk, Old Fr. fungier
funnel
fur
furbelow
furbish
furious
furnace
furnish
furniture
furor
furrier
furtive
fury, Old Fr. furie
fuselage
fusible
fusilier
fusillade
fusion
fusty
futile
future (Old Fr. futur)

G

gabardine
gabble
gaffe
gage
gaiety
gain
gaiter
gallant, compare galant
gallantry
galleon, Old Fr. galion
gallery
galley
gallimaufry
gallon
gallop, Old Fr. galop
galoshes
galvanise or galvanize
galvanism
gambit
gambol
gambrel
gamin
gamine
gammon
ganache
gangrene
gangue
gantry
garage
garb
garbage
garble
garçon
garden
gardener
garderobe
gargantuan
gargle
gargoyle
garland
garment
garner
garnet
garnish
garret
garrison
garter, Old N. Fr. gartier, compare modern Fr. jarretière
Gascon
gasconade
gash
gasket
gastronome
gastronomic
gastronomy
gateau
gauche
gaucherie
gaudy
gauge
Gaul
gaunt
gauntlet
gauze
gavage
gavotte
gay (Old Fr. gai)
Gaylord (Old Fr. Gaillard)
gazelle
gazette
gel
gelatin or gelatine, Fr. gélatine
gelatinous
gem, Old Fr. gemme
gendarme
gender, from genre
genealogical
genealogy
general
generic
generosity
generous
Genevieve
genial
genie, Fr génie
genre
genteel
gentility
gentle, Old Fr. gentil
gentry
geode
Geoffrey
geography
geometry
Gerald
Gerard
gerbil
germ

germane
Gertrude
gest
gesticulation
gesture, from geste (movement)
giant
gibbet
gibbon
giblets
giclée
gigantism
gigolo
Gilbert
Giles
gillyflower
gimbal
gimlet
gin
gingerbread
giraffe
gizzard
glace
glacial
glaciation
glacier
glacis
glaive
glance
glean
glebe
gleek
gleet (Old Fr. glette)
glissade
global
globe (Old Fr. globe)
globular
globule
glorify
glorious
glory
glucose
glue
glut, Old Fr. gloter
glutin
glutton
gluttonous
gluttony
glycerin
glycogen
glyph
gnome
gnomic
gob
gobbet
goblet, Old Fr. gobelet
goblin
Godfrey
goitre
gondolier
gorge
gorgeous
gouache
gouge
gourd
gourmand
gourmet
gout
govern
governance
governess
government
governor
gown
grace
gracious
grade
grail
grain
gram
grammar
grammarian
grammatical
grampus
grand
grandeur
grandiose
grand mal
Grand Marnier
Grand Prix
grange
granite
grant
grantor
grape
graphology
grapnel
grapple
grate
grater
gratification
gratin
grave (adj.)
gravel
gravy
grease
greave
grebe
grenade
grenadier
grenadine
griddle
grief
grievance
grieve
grievous
griffin or griffon
grill
grille
grimace
grimoire
griot
grippe
grisaille
grizzle
grizzled
grognard
grogram
grommet
gross
grotesque
group
groyne
grudge
gruel, Old Fr. gruel, compare Mod. Fr. gruau
guarantee
guaranty
guard, Middle Fr. garde
guardian, Anglo-Fr. gardein, from Old Fr. gardien
gudgeon
guerdon
guide
guidon
guile
guillotine
guise
gules
gulf, Old Fr. golfe
gullet
gum
gusset
gutter
guttural
guzzle
gynecology
gyrfalcon
gyroscope

H

haberdasher
habiliment
habit
habitable
habitant
habitat
habitation
habitual, Old Fr. habitual, compare mod. Fr. habituel
haggard
halberd
hale (v.)
halt (n.)
hamlet
hamper (n.)
hangar
harangue
harass
harassment
harbinger
hardy
harlequin, Middle Fr. Harlequin, from Old Fr. Herlequin or Hellequin
harlot, Old Fr. herlot or arlot
harmonious
harmonisation
harmonise
harmonium
harmony
harness
harpoon
harpsichord, Fr. harpechorde
harridan
hash
haste, Old Fr. haste, compare modern Fr. hâte
hasty
hatch (v.)
hatchet
hauberk
haught
haunch
haunt
hautboy
haute couture
haute cuisine
hauteur
haversack
havoc
hawser
hazard, Old Fr. hasard
hazardous
hearse
Hebrew
hectare
hectic
hectolitre
heinous
heir
Helen, Fr. Hélène, from Greek Helene
helicopter
heliotrope
hellebore
helmet
hematite
hemistich
hemorrhoid
Henry, Old Fr. Henry, from Germ. Heinrich
hepatic
herald
heraldic
heraldry
herb, Old Fr. erbe, compare modern Fr. herbe
herbage
herbal
Herbert
herbivore
heredity
heresy
heretic
heritability
heritable, Fr. héritable
heritage, Old Fr. eritage, compare modern Fr. héritage
hermit
hermitage
hero, Old Fr. heros, compare mod. Fr. héros
heroism
heron
herpetology
hideous, Anglo-Fr. hidous, from Old Fr. hideus, compare modern Fr. hideux
hierarchy, Old Fr. ierarchie, compare mod. Fr. hiérarchie
hippodrome
hippogriff
historian
historic
history, Old Fr. historie, compare mod. Fr. histoire
hod
hodgepodge, Old Fr. hochepot
hoe
hollandaise
homage
homicide
homily
honest
honesty
honour or honor, Anglo-Fr. honour, from Old Fr. onor or eneur, compare modern Fr. honneur
honourable or honorable, Old Fr. honorable, compare modern Fr. honorable
honorary
hoopla, Fr. houp là
horde
horizon
horizontal
horoscope
horrible
horror
hors de combat
hors d'œuvre
hospice
hospitable
hospital, Old Fr. hospital, compare modern Fr. hôpital
hospitality, Old Fr. hospitalité
host, Old Fr. hoste, compare modern Fr. hôte
hostage
hostel, Old Fr. hostel, compare modern Fr. hôtel
hostelry
hostile
hostility
hostler
hotel, Old Fr. hostel, compare modern Fr. hôtel
hotelier
hour, Anglo-Fr. houre, compare modern Fr. heure
Hubert
hue, Old Fr. hue
huge, Old Fr. ahuge
Hugh
Huguenot
human
humane
humanist
humanists
humanity, Old Fr. humanité
humble
humid
humidity
humiliation, Old Fr. humiliation
humility
humorous
humour or humor
hurt, Old Fr. hurter, compare modern Fr. heurter
hut, Fr. hutte, from Germ. hütte
hutch, Old Fr. huche
hydrate
hydrogen
hyena, Old Fr. hiene, compare modern Fr. hyène
hygiene, Fr. hygiène
hygienic
hygrometre
hygroscopic
hymen, Fr. hymen, from Greek hymen
hymn
hyoid
hypnagogic
hypnotic
hypochondriac, Fr. hypocondriaque
hypocrisy
hypocrite
hypothesis

I

iamb
ibogaine
iconoclast
idée fixe
identifiable
identification
identify
identity
ideologue
ideology
ides
idiocy
idiom
idiosyncrasy
idiot
idol
idolater
idolatry
ignition
ignoble
ignominious
ignominy
ignorance
ignorant
ignore
iliac
illegal
illegality
illiberal
illicit
Illinois
illumination
illumine
illusion
illusory
illustration
image
imagery
imaginary
imagination
imaginative
imagine
imbecile
imbibe
imbrication
imbrue
imbue
imitable
imitation
immanence
immanent
immature
immediate
immemorial
immense
immensity
immobile
immobilisation
immobilise
immobility
immolation
immoral
immorality
immortal
immortality
immunisation
immunise
immunity
immunology
immutability
immutable
impair
impalpable
impart
impartial
impartiality
impasse
impassible
impatience
impatient
impeach
impeachment
impeccable
impenetrable
imperceptible
imperfect
imperfection
imperial
imperious
imperishable
impermanence
impermanent
impermeability
impermeable
impermissible
impertinence
impertinent
imperturbable
impetuosity
impetuous
impi
impiety
impious
implacable
implant
implantation
implication
implicit
imply
importance
important
importation
importune
importunity
imposable
impose
imposition
impossibility
impossible
imposter
impostor
imposture
impotence
impotent
impoverish
impoverishment
imprecision
impregnable
impregnation
impression
impressionable
impressionism
impressionist
imprint
imprison
imprisonment
improbable
impromptu
improper
impropriety
improve
improvement
improvisation
improvise
imprudence
imprudent
impudence
impudent
impugn
impugnable
impulse
impulsion
impulsive
impunity
impure
impurity
imputation
impute
inability
inaccessibility
inaccessible
inaction
inactive
inactivity
inadmissible
inadvertence
inadvisable
inalienable
inane
inanition
inanity
inapplicability
inapplicable
inapt
inattention
inattentive
inaudibility
inaudible
inaugural
inauguration
inauthenticity
incalculable
incandescence
incandescent
incantation
incantatory
incapability
incapable
incapacity
incarceration
incarnadine
incarnation
incendiary
incense
inceptive
incertitude
incessant
incidence
incident
incise
incision
incisive
incite
incitement
incivility
inclination
incline
inclusion
inclusive
incoherence
incoherent
incommensurable
incommode
incommunicable
incomparable
incompatibility
incompatible
incompetence
incompetent
incomplete
incomprehensible
incomprehension
incompressible
inconceivable
inconclusive
incongruity
incongruous
inconsequent
inconsiderable
inconsolable
inconstant
incontestable
incontinence
incontinent
inconvenience
inconvenient
incorporable
incorporation
incorrect
incorrigible
incorrigibly
incorruptible
increase
incredulity
incur
incurable
incursion
indebted
indecision
indecisive
indeclinable
indefatigable
indefeasible
indemnity
indent
indentures
independence
independent
indeterminable
indexation
indication
indicative
indice
indict
indictment
indifference
indifferent
indigence
indigene
indigestion
indignation
indignity
indirect
indiscipline
indiscretion
indispensable
indispose
indisposition
indisputable
indissoluble
indistinct
indistinguishable

individualism
indivisibility
indivisible
indolence
indolent
induction
indulgence
induration
industrial
industrialisation
industrialise
industrious
industry
ineffable
ineffective
inelegance
inelegant
ineligibility
ineligible
ineluctable
inept
inequality
inequitable
inequity
inert
inescapable
inestimable
inevitability
inevitable
inexact
inexactitude
inexcusable
inexorability
inexorable
inexpedient
inexperience
inexplicable
inextricable
infamous
infamy
infantry, Fr. infanterie
infatigable
infeasible
infect
infection
infectious
infernal
infertile
infertility
infest
infestation
infidel
infidelity
infinitive
infinity
inflammable
inflammation
inflation
inflexibility
inflexible
inflexion
influence
inform
information (Old Fr. information)
infraction
infrastructure
infusion
ingenious
ingénue
ingratitude
ingredient
inhabit
inhabitable
inhabitant
inherit
inheritable
inheritance
inhibition
inhospitable
inhuman
inhumane
inhumanity
inimitable
iniquity
initial
initiation
initiative
inject
injure
injurious
injury
injustice, Old Fr. injustice
ink, Old Fr. enque, compare mod. Fr. encre
innocence
innocent
innovation, Old Fr. innovacion, compare mod. Fr. innovation
inoffensive
inquest
inquire
inquiry
inquisition
inquisitive
inquisitor
insatiable
inscription
insect
insecticide
insectivore
insemination
insense
insensibility
insensible
inseparable
insidious
insinuation
insipid
insist
insistence
insolence
insolent
insoluble
insouciance
insouciant
inspect
inspection
inspiration
inspire
instability
install
installation
instalment
instance
instant
instigation
instillation
instinct
institute
institution
institutional
institutionalisation
institutionalise
instruction
instrument
insubordination
insufficient
insult
insupportable
insurance, from assurance
insurgent, from insurgé
insurmountable, from insurmontable
insurrection
intact
intangible
integrable
integral
integrant
integration
integrity
intellectual
intelligence
intelligent
intelligible
intemperance
intend
intendant
intense
intensive
intent
intention
intentive
inter
intercede
intercept
interception
intercession
interchange
intercourse
interdict
interest
interfere
interjection
interlace
interlard
intermarriage
intermediary
interminable
intermittent
intern
interpellation
interpolation
interpose
interposition
interpret
interpretation
interrogation
interruption
intersection
interstice
interval
intervention
interventionism
interventionist
interview
intimation
intimidation
intolerable
intolerance
intolerant
intonation
intone
intransigence
intransigent
intrepid
intrigue
intrinsic, Old Fr. intrinsèque
introduction
introit
intrusion
intuition
inundation, Old Fr. inundacion, compare mod. Fr. inondation
inure
inutile
invalid
invasion
invasive
invective
inveigle
invent
invention
inventive
inventory
invert
invest
investigation
investiture
invincibility
invincible
inviolability
inviolable
invisibility
invisible
invitation
invite
invocation
invoice
invokable
invoke
invulnerability
invulnerable
iodine
irascible
ire
Irene
ironic
irony
Iroquois
irradiation
irreconcilable
irregular
irregularity
irreparable
irreproachable
irresolution
irreverence, Old Fr. irreverence
irrevocable
irrigation
irritability
irritable
irritant
irritation
irruption
isle
islet
isolation
issue
ivory, Anglo-Fr. ivorie, from Old N. Fr. ivurie, compare modern Fr. ivoire

See also 

 French phrases used by English speakers
 Law French
 Glossary of fencing, (predominantly from French).
 Glossary of ballet (predominantly from French)
 Lists of English loanwords by country or language of origin
 List of English words of Gaulish origin
 List of English words of Latin origin
 List of English Latinates of Germanic origin
 List of English words of Frankish origin
 Latin influence in English
 List of French words of Germanic origin
 List of French words of Gaulish origin
 List of French words of Arabic origin

References

External links
Oxford English Dictionary
Dictionary.com
Online Etymology Dictionary
Centre National de Ressources Textuelles et Lexicales 

French